is a Japanese football player. She plays for Tokyo Verdy Beleza and Japan national team.

Club career
Nakasato was born in Fuchu on July 14, 1994. In 2011, she joined Nippon TV Beleza from youth team. She was selected Best Eleven in 2017 season.

National team career
In August 2012, Nakasato was selected Japan U-20 national team for 2012 U-20 World Cup and Japan won 3rd place. On June 2, 2016, she debuted for Japan national team against United States. She played 20 games for Japan until 2018.

National team statistics

References

External links

Japan Football Association

1994 births
Living people
Tokyo Gakugei University alumni
Association football people from Tokyo
Japanese women's footballers
Japan women's international footballers
Nadeshiko League players
Nippon TV Tokyo Verdy Beleza players
Women's association football midfielders
Footballers at the 2018 Asian Games
Asian Games gold medalists for Japan
Asian Games medalists in football
Medalists at the 2018 Asian Games